Constantin Gheorghe (born 12 June 1976), better known by his stage name Geo Da Silva, is a Romanian DJ, MC, vocalist, entrepreneur and entertainer.

Discography

Singles

References

External links
 

1976 births
Living people
Club DJs
Romanian musicians
Romanian DJs
Electronic dance music DJs